Edgardo Mortiz (born August 30, 1954) is a Filipino actor, comedian, singer and director who is currently affiliated with GMA Network and Brightlight Productions. He previously directed numerous shows under ABS-CBN, until its shutdown where he left the network after 34 years.

Filmography

As director
Isa, Dalawa, Takbo (1996)
Pera o Bayong (Not Da TV!) (2000)
Young Love (1970)
Drakulita (1969)

As writer
Agent X44 (2007)

Film roles
Zoom, Zoom, Superman! (1973)
My Juan En Only (1982) as Andres/ Andy
Bad Bananas sa Puting Tabing (1983)
The Untouchable Family (1988) as Mad Max

Television roles
Goin' Bananas (1986–1991; ABS-CBN)
Lovingly Yours, Helen (1986–1996; GMA Network)
Maalaala Mo Kaya (1991–2020; ABS-CBN)
Rated PB: Pugad Baboy Sa TV (1992–1993; GMA Network)
Que Horror (1996–1998; TV5)
Tara Jing Pot Pot (1998–2000; ABS-CBN)
Maynila (1999; GMA Network)
Arriba, Arriba! – Sodi Arriba (2000–2003; ABS-CBN)
All Together Now (2003; GMA Network)
Basta't Kasama Kita (2003–2004; ABS-CBN)
Magpakailanman (2004; GMA Network)
O Ha! (2005; TV5)
Kampanerang Kuba – Father Agaton (Reprised Role) (2005; ABS-CBN)
Talentadong Pinoy – guest judge (2008; TV5)
Star Power – judge (2010; ABS-CBN)
It's Showtime – judge in Tawag ng Tanghalan (2016; ABS-CBN)
Dolce Amore – Ruben "Dodoy" Ibarra (2016; ABS-CBN)
Sana Dalawa ang Puso – Ramon Bulalayao (2018; ABS-CBN)
Dear Uge (2020; GMA Network)
Happy Together (2021; GMA Network)

Television credits
Tropang Trumpo (1994–1998; ABC "now TV5" ), Director
Magandang Tanghali Bayan (1999–2003; ABS-CBN), Director
Goin' Bulilit (2005–2019), Director
Mga Anghel na Walang Langit (2005; ABS-CBN), Creative Consultant
Wowowee (2005–2010), Creative Director
Let's Go (2006–2007; ABS-CBN), Director
Banana Sundae (2008–2020), Director
Pilipinas Win na Win (2010–2011), Creative Director
Happy Yipee Yehey! (2011–2012), Creative Director
Home Sweetie Home (2014–2020), Director
Luv U (2012–2016), Director
Sunday 'Kada (2020–2021), Director
Wowowin (2020–2022), Creative Director
Happy Together (2021-present), creator and director

Discography

Studio albums
My Pledge of Love (1969, Wilear's Records)
Simply the Best (1970, Wilear's Records)
Alaala ang Pagbabalik (Vicor Music Corporation)
People (Vicor Music Corporation)

Compilation album
Edgar Mortiz (Vicor Music Corporation)

Awards

References

External links

1954 births
Living people
ABS-CBN personalities
GMA Network personalities
Filipino film directors
Filipino male child actors
Filipino male comedians
Filipino male film actors
20th-century Filipino male singers
Filipino male television actors
Filipino television directors
Vicor Music artists